Kevin Leighton (born August 28, 1979) is an American baseball coach and former player, who is the current head baseball coach of the Fordham Rams. He played college baseball for the Seton Hall Pirates from 1998 to 2001. He served as the head coach of the Manhattan (2002–2005).

Playing career
After a successful high school career in Brewster, New York, Leighton was drafted in the 1997 MLB Draft by the Philadelphia Phillies.  He instead chose to attend college, and played four seasons with Seton Hall, helping the Pirates to the 2001 Big East Conference baseball tournament title, and a pair of NCAA Division I Baseball Championship appearances.  Leighton earned his degree from Seton Hall in 2001, and would later add a master's degree from Manhattan College.

Coaching career
After graduating, Leighton accepted an assistant coach position at Manhattan, serving under then-head coach Steve Trimper.  With Trimper's departure for Maine, Leighton was elevated to head coach, after just four years as an assistant.  He led the Jaspers to a pair of Metro Atlantic Athletic Conference baseball tournament titles and NCAA Division I Baseball Championship appearances.  In his first season, the Jaspers won the MAAC Tournament and advanced to regional final the NCAA tournament, resulting in Leighton being named the American Baseball Coaches Association Northeast Region Coach of the Year in 2006.  Manhattan would repeat the performance in 2011, but fell in both NCAA Tournament games.  In his time at Manhattan, Leighton coached 51 All-Conference players and produced eleven professional players.  On July 18, 2012, Leighton was named head coach at Fordham.

Head coaching record
This table shows Leighton's record as a head coach at the Division I level.

References

External links

List of current NCAA Division I baseball coaches

Living people
1979 births
People from Brewster, New York
Fordham Rams baseball coaches
Manhattan Jaspers baseball coaches
Manhattan College alumni
Seton Hall Pirates baseball players
Baseball coaches from New York (state)